Oman competed at the 2017 World Aquatics Championships in Budapest, Hungary from 14 July to 30 July.

Swimming

Oman Virgin Islands has received a Universality invitation from FINA to send a male swimmer to the World Championships.

References

Nations at the 2017 World Aquatics Championships
Oman at the World Aquatics Championships
2017 in Omani sport